Kathleen J. Murphy is an American state representative from the Commonwealth of Virginia. She is a member of the Virginia House of Delegates for the 34th district, encompassing McLean, Great Falls, and parts of Vienna and Loudoun County. She is a member of the Democratic Party.

Murphy sits on the House Finance Committee and the Privileges and Elections Committee.
 
Murphy ran for the 34th district seat in the 2013 elections against incumbent Republican Barbara Comstock, but lost. When Comstock won election to the United States House of Representatives in 2014, Murphy ran in the special election to succeed Comstock in the House of Delegates. Murphy defeated Republican Craig Parisot to win the seat.

Background
Murphy is the former President of Johnson Murphy & Associates, a consulting firm based in McLean that provides strategic counseling and builds legislative strategies for companies and non-profit organizations. Previously she worked as a Senior Advisor for International Trade issues at the Department of Commerce (2000-20001) and handled Congressional Affairs at USAID (1996-2000) during the Clinton administration.

She worked for Congressman Charlie Wilson (D-TX)(1993-1996) where she held a Top Secret security clearance and handled Defense and Foreign Operations appropriations.

She was a writer and producer at Nickelodeon and deputy director of women's outreach at the Democratic National Committee.
Murphy helped found Salute Our Services, which helped connect service members deployed overseas with their families and Kids Serve Too, an organization to honor and support children in military families.

Murphy is currently a member of the Human Services Council for Fairfax County, the McLean Community Foundation, the Fairfax County Health Care Task Force and serves on a fundraising board for the Cystic Fibrosis Foundation. She is an active member of the Fairfax County Democratic Party and has worked as a Precinct leader for over 15 years.

She graduated from American University, magna cum laude.

Murphy is the mother of 4 children and 2 step children.  She and her husband, attorney Bill Sudow, are long time McLean residents.

Electoral history

2013 campaign
In 2013, Murphy ran for the House of Delegates 34th district seat against incumbent Republican Barbara Comstock.  She ran a competitive race and lost by less than 1% of the vote, despite being outspent by her Republican opponent more than two to one.

Results

2015 special election
When Comstock was elected to the United States House of Representatives in 2014, Murphy ran in the special election to succeed Comstock in the Virginia House of Delegates. Murphy defeated Republican Craig Parisot to win the seat.

Results

2017 general election
Murphy won re-election in 2017, a banner year for Democrats in the House of Delegates. She outspent her Republican opponent more than six to one.  Vinton Cerf contributed $10,000.

Results

2019 general election 
Murphy won re-election in 2019.

Results

2021 general election 
Murphy won re-election in 2021.

Results

References

Living people
Democratic Party members of the Virginia House of Delegates
Women state legislators in Virginia
People from McLean, Virginia
21st-century American politicians
1948 births
American University alumni
Democratic National Committee people
Clinton administration personnel
Place of birth missing (living people)
21st-century American women politicians